Pulaski Park is a park in the West Town neighborhood of Chicago, Illinois. It was founded in 1912, and was named after American Revolutionary War hero Casimir Pulaski.

Pulaski Park derives its name from the historic park and fieldhouse that was designed by Jens Jensen between 1912 and 1914.  1,200 people were displaced, leading to the razing of a number of buildings while others were moved to nearby locations in the neighborhood.

The park and fieldhouse were listed on the National Register of Historic Places on August 13, 1981. It became an official Chicago Landmark on July 29, 2003.

The neighborhood in the park's vicinity within West Town is called Pulaski Park after the park.

See also

Parks of Chicago
Chicago Swordplay Guild

References

External links
Chicago Landmarks site
Chicago Park District site

Parks in Chicago
West Side, Chicago
Polish-American culture in Chicago
Parks on the National Register of Historic Places in Chicago
Chicago Landmarks
American Craftsman architecture in Illinois
1912 establishments in Illinois